Polyxenus Epiphanes Soter ("Polyxenus the Illustrious Saviour") was an Indo-Greek king who ruled briefly in western Punjab or Gandhara.

Date
Osmund Bopearachchi places Polyxenus c. 100 BCE and R. C. Senior c. 85–80 BCE.

Coinage
Polyxenus, whose portraits depict a diademed young man, struck silver coins which closely resemble those of Strato I. Both kings used the epithets Soter Epiphanes and the reverse of Athena Alcidemus (fighting Pallas Athene), the emblem of the dynasty of Menander I. Polyxenus also struck bronzes with Athena on the obverse and her aegis on the reverse. He issued no Attic silver.

His bronzes depict the head of Athena with a reverse of her aegis.

Polyxenus' coins are few and feature only three monograms: these he shares with Strato I as well as Heliocles II and Archebius, according to Bopearachchi and RC Senior.

He was therefore likely to have been a brief contestant for power in the central Indo-Greek kingdom after the presumably violent death of Straton I, who was possibly his father.

Notes

References
Osmund Bopearachchi, Sylloge Nummorum Graecorum: American Numismatic Society, part 9, Graeco-Bactrian and Indo-Greek Coins, 1998, American Numismatic Society, .

External links
Catalog of the coins of Polyxenus
Le Roi Polyxène

Indo-Greek kings
1st-century BC rulers in Asia